Omar ibn Said ( ʿUmar bin Saeed; 1770–1864) was a Fula Islamic scholar from Futa Toro in West Africa (present-day Senegal), who was enslaved and transported to the United States in 1807.  There, while enslaved for the remainder of his life, he wrote a series of Arabic-language works on history and theology, including a short autobiography.

Biography 
Omar ibn Said was born to a wealthy family in the Imamate of Futa Toro, an Islamic theocratic state located along the Middle Senegal River in West Africa. He was an Islamic scholar and a Fula who spent 25 years of his life studying with prominent Muslim scholars, learning a range of subjects including mathematics, astronomy, business, and theology. In 1807, he was captured during a military conflict, enslaved and taken across the Atlantic Ocean to the United States. He escaped from a cruel master in Charleston, South Carolina, and journeyed to Fayetteville, North Carolina. There he was recaptured, sent to jail, and later sold to James Owen, whom Omar ibn Said described as being gracious towards him. The Owen family was impressed by ibn Said's education, and they provided him with an English translation of the Quran. He also received an Arabic translation of the Bible with the help of Francis Scott Key, author of "The Star-Spangled Banner." Ibn Said was offered multiple opportunities to return to Africa, but he chose to remain in the United States, citing his uncertainty that his family and his people were still intact. He lived into his mid-nineties and was still enslaved at the time of his death in 1864.  He was buried in Bladen County, North Carolina. Omar ibn Sa'id was also known as Uncle Moreau and Prince Omeroh.

The back of this card contains another person's handwriting in English misidentifying the sura as the Lord's Prayer and attesting to Omar's status as a good Christian. Additionally, while others writing on Omar's behalf identified him as a Christian, his own autobiography and other writings offer more of an ambiguous position. In the autobiography, he still offers praise to Muhammad when describing his life in his own country; his references to "Jesus the Messiah" in fact parallel Quranic descriptions of Jesus (who is called  'the Messiah' a total of eleven times in the Quran), and descriptions of Jesus as 'our lord/master' employ the typical Islamic honorific for prophets and is not to be confused with Lord; and description of Jesus as 'bringing grace and truth' (a reference to John 1:14) is equally appropriate to the conception of Jesus in Islam. But it was most likely he stayed a Muslim his whole life, except for the confusion of others thinking that he had converted when simply, he loved Jesus, as most normal Muslims do but not to the point of Christianity. This was stated in his auto-biography.

Literary analysis of ibn Said's autobiography suggests that he wrote it for two audiences, the white literates who sought to exploit his conversion to Christianity and Muslim readers who would recognize Qur'anic literary devices and subtext and understand his position as a fellow Muslim using Taqiya to hide his faith while living under persecution. In a letter written to Sheikh Hunter regarding the autobiography, he apologized for forgetting the "talk" of his homeland and ended the letter saying: "O my brothers, do not blame me," with the knowledge that Hunter would require Arabic-speaking translators to read the message. Scholar Basima Kamel Shaheen argues that Said's spiritual ambiguity may have been purposefully cultivated to impress upon a wide readership the injustices of slavery.

Manuscripts

Omar ibn Said authored fourteen manuscripts in Arabic. The best known of these is his autobiographical essay, The Life of Omar Ibn Said, written in 1831. It describes some of the events of his life and includes reflections on his steadfast adherence to Islam and his openness towards other "God-fearing" people. On the surface, the document may appear to be tolerant towards slavery; however, Said begins it with Surat Al-Mulk, a chapter from the Qur'an, which states that only God has sovereignty over human beings. The manuscript is the only known Arabic autobiography by a person enslaved in the United States. It was sold as part of a collection of Said's documents between private collectors and later acquired by the Library of Congress in 2017. It has since been treated for preservation and made available for viewing online.

Most of Said's other work consisted of Islamic manuscripts in Arabic, including a handwritten copy of some short chapters (surat) from the Qur'an that are now part of the North Carolina Collection in the Wilson Library at University of North Carolina at Chapel Hill.  Transcribing from memory, ibn Said made some mistakes in his work, notably at the start of Surat An-Nasr. His Bible, a translation into Arabic published by a missionary society, which has notations in Arabic by Said, is part of the rare books collection at Davidson College. Said also authored a letter in Arabic dated 1819 addressed to James Owen's brother, Major John Owen. It contains numerous Quranic references (including from the above-mentioned Surat Al-Mulk) and includes several geometric symbols and shapes which suggest to its possible esoteric intentions. This letter is currently held at Andover Theological Seminary.

Legacy
In 1991, a mosque in Fayetteville, North Carolina renamed itself Masjid Omar ibn Sayyid in his honor.

Gallery

See also
 Islam in the United States
 List of slaves

References

Further reading

External links

 Omar Ibn Said Collection at Library of Congress

1770 births
1864 deaths
19th-century American slaves
19th-century Muslim scholars of Islam
African-American Muslims
American Arabic writers
American autobiographers
American historians
American Muslim slaves
American literature in immigrant languages
American people of Fulbe descent
American people of Senegalese descent
American theologians
People from Bladen County, North Carolina
Senegalese non-fiction writers
Writers from Charleston, South Carolina